Stenus alpicola is a species of rove beetle in the genus Stenus. It was described in 1872.

References

Steninae
Beetles described in 1872